Gare de Carentan is a railway station serving the town Carentan, Manche department, Normandy, northwestern France. 

It is situated on the Mantes-la-Jolie–Cherbourg railway.

Services

The station is served by regional trains to Cherbourg, Caen and Paris.

References

External links
 

Railway stations in Manche
Railway stations in France opened in 1858